Stanislav Evgenievich Meleiko (Russian: Станислав Евгеньевич Мелейко) (February 6, 1937 – March 8, 2021) was a Russian journalist, TV presenter, director, and producer of his own programs. 

Meleiko was the author and presenter of the program Citizen and the Law on Channel 5 from 1970 to 1996. Since 1997, he was the author of his own programs. He prepared programs and reports for various television and Internet Channels of REN TV.

References

Russian journalists
1937 births
2021 deaths